Lina Nielsen (born 13 March 1996) is a British sprinter, hurdler and yoga instructor.

Career
She won the 400 m hurdles at the 2021 European Athletics Team Championships with 55.59. Nielsen has a twin sister, Laviai Nielsen, who is also an international athlete over 400m.

Lina is also a yoga teacher, having undertaken her teaching training in Rikshikesh in the summer of 2019. She is now one of the yoga instructors on the fitness app Fiit.

Personal life
Nielsen grew up in Leytonstone, East London. In 2017, she graduated from Queen Mary University of London with a degree in Chemistry.

In August 2022, Nielsen revealed she had been diagnosed with multiple sclerosis. at the age of 17. She chose to keep her diagnosis private for nine years, but after suffering a relapse two days prior to her World Athletics Championships heats in Oregon she decided to go public with her story.

References

External links
 

1996 births
Living people
Alumni of Queen Mary University of London
Athletes from London
British female sprinters
British identical twins
English female sprinters
British Athletics Championships winners
Black British sportswomen
People from Leytonstone
20th-century British women
21st-century British women
World Athletics Championships medalists
People with multiple sclerosis